Performance is the eighth studio album by American band White Denim. It was released on August 24, 2018, through City Slang.

Accolades

Track listing

Charts

References

2018 albums
White Denim albums
City Slang albums